Leisure is time spent away from work, domestic chores, and other necessary activities.

Leisure may also refer to:

Places 
 Leisure, Indiana
 Leisure, Michigan

People 
 David Leisure (born 1950), American actor 
 Peter K. Leisure (born 1929), United States federal judge

Arts, entertainment, and media 
 Leisure (album), a 1991 album by Blur
 Leisure (band), a band from Auckland, New Zealand
 "Leisure" (poem), a 1911 poem by William Henry Davies
 Leisure (film), a 1976 animated short film
 "Leisure", a 1982 song by XTC from English Settlement

Companies 
 Leisure Air, an American charter airline 1992-1995
 Leisure Books, an imprint of Dorchester Publishing
 Leisure International Airways, a British charter airline 1996-1999

See also